5 Easy Pieces is a box set anthology of the career (to date) of Scott Walker. It was released in November 2003.  The set comprises five themed CDs and a 56-page booklet.

Track listing
All tracks written by Scott Walker, unless otherwise noted. (NB: Walker is sometimes credited as Scott Engel or N. S. Engel; these instances are noted as such in the listing.)
All tracks performed by Scott Walker, except † by The Walker Brothers, ‡ by Ute Lemper, and 2.16 by Esther Ofarim .

CD 1: In My Room
The complete bedsit dramas, including the kitchen sink
 "Prologue/Little Things" – 3:39 (Scott Walker, Ady Semel)
 "I Don't Want To Hear It Anymore" † – 3:45 (Randy Newman)
 "In My Room" † – 2:32 (Joaquin Prieto, translated by Lee Julien Pockriss and Paul Vance)
 "After the Lights Go Out" † – 4:06 (John Stewart)
 "Archangel" † – 3:41
 "Orpheus"  † – 3:24
 "Mrs Murphy" – 3:19
 "Montague Terrace (In Blue)" – 3:27
 "Such A Small Love" – 4:52
 "The Amorous Humphrey Plugg" – 4:29
 "It's Raining Today" – 3:59
 "Rosemary" – 3:20
 "Big Louise" – 3:08
 "Angels Of Ashes" – 4:19
 "Hero Of The War" – 2:24
 "Time Operator" – 3:36 (Walker, Semel)
 "Joe" – 3:40 (Walker, Semel)
 "The War Is Over (Sleepers-Epilogue)" – 3:36 (Walker, Semel)

CD 2: Where's The Girl?
Songs of a Lady, Love and Loss
 "Where's The Girl?" † – 3:11 (Jerry Leiber, Mike Stoller)
 "You're All Around Me" † – 2:37 (Scott Walker, Lesley Duncan)
 "Just Say Goodbye" † – 3:36 (Petula Clark, Pierre Delanoë, Tony Hatch)
 "Hurting Each Other" † – 2:42 (Peter Udell, Gary Geld)
 "Genevieve" † – 2:51
 "Once Upon A Summertime" † – 3:50 (Eddie Marnay, Eddie Barclay, Michel Legrand, translated by Johnny Mercer)
 "When Joanna Loved Me" – 3:07 (Robert Wells, Jack Segal)
 "Joanna" – 3:52 (Tony Hatch, Jackie Trent)
 "Angelica" – 4:00 (Cynthia Weil, Barry Mann)
 "Always Coming Back To You" – 2:36
 "The Bridge" – 2:47
 "Best Of Both Worlds" – 3:13 (Melvin R London, Don Black)
 "Two Weeks Since You've Gone" – 2:45
 "On Your Own Again" – 1:45
 "Someone Who Cared" – 2:57
 "Long About Now" (sung by Esther Ofarim) – 2:05 (Walker, Semel)
 "Scope J" ‡ – 10:50 (N. S. Engel)
 "Lullaby (by-by-by)" ‡ – 11:05 (N. S. Engel)

CD 3: An American In Europe
Home and away: songs from Europe and America
 "Jackie" – 3:20 (Mort Shuman, Jacques Brel, Gérard Jouannest)
 "Mathilde" – 2:36 (Shuman, Brel, Jouannest)
 "The Girls And The Dogs" – 3:07 (Shuman, Brel, Jouannest)
 "Amsterdam" – 3:04 (Brel, Shuman)
 "Next" – 2:49 (Brel, Shuman)
 "The Girls From The Streets" – 4:08
 "My Death" – 4:56 (Brel, Shuman)
 "Sons Of" – 3:43 (Brel, Shuman, Jouannest)
 "If You Go Away" – 4:58 (Jacques Brel, Rod McKuen)
 "Copenhagen" – 2:24
 "We Came Through" – 1:56
 "30 Century Man" – 1:27
 "Rhymes Of Goodbye" – 3:04
 "Thanks For Chicago Mr James" – 2:15 (Walker, Semel)
 "Cowbells Shakin'" – 1:05 (Walker, Semel)
 "My Way Home" – 3:28 (Walker, Semel)
 "Lines" † – 3:26 (Jerry Fuller)
 "Rawhide" – 3:50
 "Blanket Roll Blues" – 3:12 (Tennessee Williams, Kenyon Hopkins)
 "Tilt" – 5:05
 "Patriot (a single)"  – 7:59

CD 4: This Is How You Disappear
The darkest hour is just before dawn: 15 big hits
 "The Plague" – 3:34
 "Plastic Palace People" – 6:05
 "Boy Child" – 3:37
 "Shutout" † – 2:46 (Scott Engel)
 "Fat Mama Kick" † – 2:52 (Scott Engel)
 "Nite Flights" † – 4:20 (Scott Engel)
 "The Electrician" † – 6:01 (Scott Engel)
 "Dealer" – 5:08
 "Track 3"  "Delayed" – 3:42
 "Sleepwalkers Woman" – 4:11
 "Track 5" a.k.a. "It's A Starving" – 3:32
 "Farmer In The City" – 6:35 (Scott Walker, Pete Walsh)
 "The Cockfighter" – 5:58
 "Bouncer See Bouncer..." – 8:34
 "Face On Breast" – 5:14

CD 5: Scott On Screen
Music from and for films
 "Light" – 3:20
 "Deadlier Than The Male" † – 2:32
 "The Rope and the Colt" (Andre Hossein, Hal Shapper) – 2:01
 "Meadow" – 1:24
 "The Seventh Seal" – 4:58
 "The Darkest Forest" – 5:44
 "The Ballad of Sacco and Vanzetti" – (Theme from Sacco e Vanzetti) (Joan Baez, Ennio Morricone) – 3:32
 "Theme from Summer of '42 (The Summer Knows)" - (Alan Bergman, Marilyn Bergman, Michel Legrand)" – 3:20
 "Glory Road" (The Theme from W.U.S.A.) (Neil Diamond) – 3:32
 "Isabel" – 6:39
 "Man From Reno" (Scott Walker, Goran Bregović) – 4:21
 "The Church of the Apostles" – 5:50
 "Indecent Sacrifice" (Walker, Bregović) – 4:07
 "Bombupper" – 0:52
 "I Threw It All Away" (Bob Dylan) – 2:20
 "River of Blood" – 1:25
 "Only Myself to Blame" (Don Black, David Arnold) – 3:38
 "Running" – 1:44
 "The Time Is Out of Joint!" – 1:09
 "Never Again" – 1:27
 "Closing" – 1:53

References

Scott Walker (singer) albums
2003 compilation albums
Mercury Records compilation albums